Goran Brkić (Serbian Cyrillic: Горан Бркић; born 28 April 1991) is a Serbian professional footballer who plays as a midfielder for Serbian First League club Železničar Pančevo.

Career
Brkić was born in Pančevo and started his career at OFK Beograd. In 2008, he was loaned to Palilulac Beograd.

In the next season, he was loaned again, but this time to the second division club Mladost Apatin. During the 2010–11 season, Brkić was a member of the OFK Beograd first team squad, but lacked playing time, so in the spring of 2011, he was loaned again to Kolubara, with whom he successfully battled relegation in the Serbian First League. Brkić later moved from OFK Beograd to Metalac Gornji Milanovac. He was a member of the team that won a place in the Serbian SuperLiga, contributing a goal in the play-off match against Napredak Kruševac. On 24 February 2020, Kazakhstan Premier League club Taraz announced the signing of Brkić.

On 18 January 2021, he signed a one-year contract with Bosnian Premier League club Tuzla City. Brkić scored his first goal for Tuzla in his debut against city rivals Sloboda in a league game on 28 February 2021.

International
Brkić was a member of Serbian youth national teams, and played at the 2008 UEFA European Under-17 Championship.

Honours
Olimpija Ljubljana
Slovenian PrvaLiga: 2017–18
Slovenian Cup: 2017–18, 2018–19

References

External links

1991 births
Living people
Sportspeople from Pančevo
Serbian footballers
Serbia youth international footballers
Association football midfielders
OFK Beograd players
FK Palilulac Beograd players
FK Mladost Apatin players
FK Kolubara players
FK Jedinstvo Užice players
FK Metalac Gornji Milanovac players
FK Zemun players
FK Mladost Doboj Kakanj players
Serbian expatriate footballers
Serbian expatriate sportspeople in Slovenia
Expatriate footballers in Slovenia
Premier League of Bosnia and Herzegovina players
Slovenian PrvaLiga players
Kazakhstan Premier League players
NK Olimpija Ljubljana (2005) players
NK Triglav Kranj players
FC Taraz players
FK Tuzla City players